The Weymouth Wildcats were a British motorcycle speedway team based in Weymouth, England, who raced in the National League. The Wildcats won the first Conference League Championship in their history in 2008 after winning the Conference League play-offs. They closed down in 2010. In 2019 they raced at Wimborne Road, the home of Poole Pirates in the Midland Southern Development League hoping to relocate into Weymouth later.

History
Speedway at the Wessex Stadium started in 1954 under the promotion of J W Coates, R Barzilay and W J (Bill) Dutton. In 1955 Weymouth entered National League Division 2. Early names for the club were Weymouth Scorchers and Weymouth Royals. When the British League formed a second division in 1968, Wally Mawdsley and Pete Lansdale entered a team from Weymouth which was known as Weymouth Eagles. The Eagles finished ninth out of 10 in the 1968 Division 2.

Harry Davis, in 1974, teamed up with Boston promoters Cyril Crane, Gordon Parkins and Ted Holding to enter the (renamed) Weymouth Wizards in British League Division 2.

In 1975 the Wizards finished in last place out of 20 teams in the League (renamed from British League Division 2 in 1974 to National League).

1978 saw yet another new name, Weymouth Wildcats and new colours (red and white replacing the purple and white), Len Silver (Hackney) taking over as promoter. But Len Silver withdrew from the promotion of Weymouth Speedway during the winter of 1978/79, following a disagreement over terms for using the stadium and Allied Presentations (the promotion at Reading) stepped in to take over the licence.

Early in 1980 Allied Presentations announced that they would no longer promote Speedway in Weymouth leading to local businessman Mervyn Stewkesbury becoming the new promoter. In 1981, the Wildcats finished runners-up in the League.
1983 Weymouth retained the National League Pairs Championship.

In 2003, after a break of nearly twenty years, former rider and childhood fan Brian White fulfilled a personal dream of bringing speedway racing back to Weymouth. This time the Wildcats returned at a new venue, the Wessex Stadium. In speedway terms, White called it "the greatest week of his life". Bringing the sport back to the area was no easy task for White, who overcame large opposition and many obstacles. Planning permission was initially turned down in the hamlet of Buckland Ripers, and whilst the proposal seemed to have the local council's backing, a 400-name petition against the establishing of a speedway team there soon stopped the plan in its tracks. Whilst many would simply have given up at this setback, White persevered, and was eventually persuaded to re-start talks with Weymouth F.C. about the possibility of racing at the Wessex Stadium. After long negotiations and two and a half years of hard work, White's dream was finally realised when West Dorset District Council gave the needed approval for the Wildcats' return on Thursday, 3 July 2003. White pencilled in the official return of speedway in Weymouth for Saturday, August 2 2003, where riders competed in the Wessex Rosebowl in front of 2500 fans. The winner of the meeting was rider Justin Elkins. White and everybody who helped him were lauded and given widespread praise. Former Wildcats' captain Martin Yeates was quoted as saying, "what Brian White has done here is amazing. He's given the town back their beloved sport and this time I just hope it's here to stay". Former Australian national team boss Neil Street also added, "I kept having to pinch myself to make sure I was watching speedway in Weymouth again. It's been a long wait for the return of the sport and what a way to bring it back".

In November 2010 the club was shut down after their landlords, Morgan Sindall and Wessex Delivery, repossessed the track for non-payment of rent. Despite attempts by local businessman, Harold Doonan, to re-open the club, the landlords subsequently dismantled and removed the track and applied to West Dorset District Council for permission to use the land for open storage.

In 2017 they were entered into the newly formed SDL league with James Tresadern and Martin Peters as co-promoters and co-owners. After a successful season racing out of Plymouth Speedway in 2017 they moved to Eastbourne for 2018. In 2019 they have moved to the home of the Poole Pirates. For the 2019 season, Adrian Young and Malcolm Brown were made up to Commercial Managers to run the business side of the team. As of 2021 they were not entered in a league.

Season summary

Riders previous seasons

2019 team
Midland Southern Development League

James Laker (Captain)
 James Jessop (Vice-Captain)
Andrew Palmer 
Jacob Clouting
Jordan Bull
Francesca Kirtley-Paine
Sam Peters

2018 team

Southern Development League

Jordan Bull (Captain)
James Jessop 
Bailey Fellows (Vice-Captain)
Jake Fellows
Connor Fletcher
Luke Barnes

2017 team

Southern Development League

Kenny Bowdrey (captain)
Mick Sutton (vice-captain)
Tom Meakins
Chris Bambury
James Chattin
James Jessop

2010 team
Tom Brown
Byron Bekker
Adam McKinna
James Cockle
Luke Chessell
Richard Andrews
Karl Mason
Nick Alford

2009 Team
Jon Armstrong
Terry Day
James Cockle
Matt Wright
Lee Smart
Tim Webster
James White-Williams
Benji Compton
Lee Smethills

2008 Team
Jon Armstrong
Brendan Johnson
Luke Priest
Andrew Bargh
Jay Herne
Kyle Newman 
Tim Webster
Lee Herne

2007 Team
Lee Smart
Karl Mason
Dan Giffard
Nathan Irwin
Jay Herne
Sam Hurst
Terry Day
Mark Thompson
David Mason

2006 Team
David Mason
Adam Filmer
Jordan Frampton
Danny Warwick
Chris Johnson
Mark Jones
Terry Day
1975 Team Wizards
Brian Woodward
Chris Robins
Vic Harding
Nigel Couzens
Martin Yeates
Roger Stratton
1976 Team  Wizards
Martin Yeates
Chris Robins
Roger Stratton
Vic Harding
Garry May
Trevor Charley

References

Speedway Conference League teams
Speedway National League teams
Sport in Dorset
Sport in Weymouth, Dorset